Rachel Claire Paiement (born 1955) is a Canadian musician and songwriter. She is best known as a former member, singer and songwriter for the Franco-Ontarian band CANO in the 1970s. She also appeared as a guest musician on albums by Bruce Cockburn and Connie Kaldor, appeared in theatre productions for the Théâtre du Nouvel-Ontario and worked as a backup singer for Paul Anka on tour.

Paiement left CANO in 1980 to join their producer, Jim Vallance, in Vancouver and was later married. Vallance is best known as the longtime songwriting partner of Bryan Adams and has also worked as music industry songwriter for many other artists. Vallance and David Foster primarily wrote the charity song "Tears Are Not Enough" in 1985 to which Paiement wrote the French verse. She has primarily concentrated on raising a family as she and Vallance have a son, born in 1989. Paiement has chosen not to maintain an active music career; when CANO reunited at the 2010 La Nuit sur l'étang festival in Sudbury, her sister Monique appeared as the band's female vocalist.

Paiement was born in Sturgeon Falls, Ontario.

Her son, Jimmy Vallance, is a member of music duo Bob Moses.

References

1955 births
Living people
Canadian women folk singers
Canadian folk singers
Canadian songwriters
Franco-Ontarian people
Musicians from Ontario
Writers from Ontario
People from West Nipissing
Canadian folk rock musicians
French-language singers of Canada
Canadian women rock singers